"Mi destino fue quererte" is a ranchera song written by Felipe Valdés Leal in 1940.

Recordings
It was recorded by ranchera singer and actress Flor Silvestre for her studio album La sentimental (1964) and became one of her greatest hits and signature songs.

Chart

References

External links

1940 songs
Mexican folk songs
Spanish-language songs
Flor Silvestre songs